The 3rd Annual NFL Honors was an  awards presentation by the National Football League honoring its best players from the 2013 NFL season. It was held on February 1, 2014, at Radio City Music Hall. Alec Baldwin returned for the third year to host the show. The show aired on Fox. Unlike previous NFL seasons, the Pro Football Hall of Fame announced its HOF Class of 2014 inductees during this award presentation.

List Award winners

References

NFL Honors 003
2013 National Football League season
2014 sports awards
2014 in American football
2014 in sports in New York City
2010s in Manhattan
American football in New York City
Sports in Manhattan
February 2014 sports events in the United States
Radio City Music Hall